FirstMark Capital is a venture capital firm based in New York City. FirstMark invests in early-stage technology companies, frequently as the first institutional investor. Notable investments include Airbnb, Pinterest, Shopify, DraftKings, Upwork, and Ro.

History
FirstMark was founded in 2008 by Amish Jani and Rick Heitzmann as a spinoff from Pequot Capital Management. 

In June of 2020, FirstMark announced FirstMark V (a $380M early-stage fund) and Opportunity Fund III (a $270M growth stage fund). In October of 2020, FirstMark announced FirstMark Horizon Acquisition Corp, a special-purpose acquisition company (SPAC) listed on the New York Stock Exchange.

Team
As of 2022, the firm has five investing partners: Rick Heitzmann, Amish Jani, Matt Turck, Beth Ferreira, and Adam Nelson.

Investments
The firm's most notable investments include Pinterest, which debuted on New York Stock Exchange on April 18, 2019, as well as Shopify. Other notable investments include Riot Games, creator of League of Legends (acquired by Tencent Holdings), InVision, Discord, Airbnb, Upwork, TraceLink, Dataiku, Dashlane, Starry, and Ro.

References

External links
 FirstMark Capital (company website)

Venture capital firms of the United States
Companies based in New York City
Financial services companies established in 2008